= Nor Kokhp =

- Location within Armenia
- Coordinates: 40°09′52″N 44°27′29″E
- Country: Armenia
- Marz (Province): Yerevan
- Time zone: UTC+4 ( )
  - Summer (DST): UTC+5 ( )

Nor Kokhp (also, Nor-Kokhb) is a town in the Yerevan region of Armenia.
